28 Aquarii is a single star located about 560 light years away from the Sun in the zodiac constellation of Aquarius. 28 Aquarii is the Flamsteed designation. It is visible to the naked eye as a dim, orange-hued star with an apparent visual magnitude of 5.6. This object is moving further from the Earth with a heliocentric radial velocity of +8.1 km/s.

This 2.9 billion year old object is an aging giant star with a stellar classification of K2 III. After exhausting the hydrogen at its core, this star evolved off the main sequence and has now expanded to 28 times the Sun's radius. It has 1.47 times the mass of the Sun and is radiating 258 times the Sun's luminosity from its swollen photosphere at an effective temperature of 4,361 K.

References 

Aquarius (constellation)
Aquarii, 028
K-type giants
209128
8390
Durchmusterung objects
108691